Hristo Kostanda  (1 January 1918 – 27 November 1978), known as with his given nickname Sütçü ( Milkman), was a Turkish footballer.

He is most known for his spell at Beşiktaş J.K, where he took a part of colloquially known unforgettable Beşiktaş squad, including club's iconic players such as Hakkı Yeten, Şeref Görkey and Şükrü Gülesin.

Style of play and reception
Kostanda is regarded as one of "club legends" by Beşiktaş J.K. During his professional career, Kostanda possessed renown attributes of strength, ball control and long-range shots. He had ability of enhanced long-range-passing supported by his ambidexterity.

Personal life
Kostanda was descendant of a Christian-Macedonian family from Macedonia administrative region of Greece.
Along with football career, he ran a family business involved in dairy products.

Kostanda was married with two daughters, both played volleyball. Lidya, her elder daughter (born 1951) died in May 1972. Violet Duca, his younger daughter born 1958, played volleyball at Eczacıbaşı S.K. between 1972 and 1986 and, represented Turkey 120 times.

In February 1977, Kostanda had a heart attack. Later suffered from a stroke, Kostanda died on 27 November 1977.  He was buried in Feriköy Bulgarian Cemetery.

Achievements
 Turkish National Division (2): 1944,  1947 
 Istanbul Football Cup (2): 1944, 1946 
 Prime Minister's Cup (1): 1944

Individual
Beşiktaş J.K. Squads of Century (Bronze Team)

References
Citations

Bibliography

External links
 Kostanda at Beşiktaş J.K.

1918 births
1978 deaths
Turkish footballers
Turkish people of Greek descent
Association football defenders
Footballers from Istanbul
Beşiktaş J.K. footballers